Sir Andrew Snape Hammond was a merchant vessel launched at Calcutta in 1802. By 1807 her name had changed to Udny (or Udney). In 1807 the French captured her, but she eventually returned to non-French ownership and Calcutta registry. She was wrecked in 1824.

Career
In 1803 Sir Andrew Snape Hammonds owner was S. Teague. 

It is not clear when Sir Andrew Snape Hammond was renamed Udny.

The French frigate  captured Udny on 2 October 1807. At the time the name of her master was Walteas or Wallis. Udny (or Adny) was carrying a cargo of saltpeter, wine, grain, and 5,625 sacks of rice. The value of the prize was 201,316.54 French francs.

It is not clear how or when Udny returned to Calcutta registry, though it is clear that she did.

Loss
Lloyd's List reported on 17 December 1824 that Udney, Holden, master, had been sighted off Île Bourbon on 29 May 1824 whilst on a voyage from Bengal to London. At the time of the report there had been no further trace, and so she was presumed foundered with the loss of all hands. Actually, Udney, Houlding, master, had wrecked at Inhambane Bay, Mozambique, on her passage from Calcutta and Madras for London.

She had sprung a leak on 15 June while she was off Natal, but had gotten into Delagoa Bay on the 19th. On the 21st she had been blown out of the Bay, resulting in her wreck on 2 July. Her crew and passengers were saved, and the whaler  carried them to Saint Helena. Some pepper and cardamums of Udnys cargo had been saved too. Sixty-five cases of cardamums and 235 bags of pepper were sold at Mozambique for the benefit of the underwriters.

Citations

References
 
 
 

1802 ships
British ships built in India
Age of Sail merchant ships of England
Captured ships
Maritime incidents in July 1824